Arthur Henry Seymour Casswell  (8 October 1892 – 29 October 1940) was an English first-class cricketer and an officer in the Royal Navy and the Royal Naval Air Service.

References

External links

1892 births
1940 deaths
People from the Borough of Waverley
People educated at Tonbridge School
Royal Navy officers
Royal Navy personnel of World War I
Recipients of the Distinguished Service Cross (United Kingdom)
English cricketers
Royal Navy cricketers